Grace Mandeville (born 28 November 1994) is a British actress, vlogger, model, television presenter, and internet personality best known for portraying Holly on CBBC's The Sparticle Mystery and for her and her sister's YouTube channel, "Mandeville Sisters." She also has a younger brother called Henry.

Early life and education
Grace Mandeville was born in London, England with a foreshortened right arm. She has one younger sister, Amelia, who she shares her YouTube channel with, and one younger brother, Henry. Mandeville attended sixth form in Surrey which she attended while filming The Sparticle Mystery. Mandeville chose to further pursue acting instead of attend university.

Career

Acting

Mandeville began seriously acting when she was fifteen, getting mostly advertorial jobs. Prior to this she appeared as an extra in Harry Potter and the Order of the Phoenix as a Hogwarts student. In 2010, she was cast as Holly in the CBBC show, The Sparticle Mystery, which premiered in February 2011. Mandeville also appeared in BBC3's The Fear alongside her younger sister, Amelia. She has also appeared in advertisements for Huawei and Matalan and is frequently in CBBC shorts such as Lifebabble and Whoops I Missed the Bus with her sister. In 2016, Mandeville also appeared as a panelist in the CBBC show, The Dog Ate My Homework.

In 2016, Mandeville and her sister began presenting for MTV UK.

Mandeville Sisters

Mandeville and her younger sister Amelia created a YouTube channel in December 2013 called the "Mandeville Sisters". The channel has since amassed over 114,000 subscribers. The sisters film weekly vlogs called the "MandevWeekly," and additionally post one other video during the week. They have filmed a number of videos surrounding disabilities and everyday life with one hand. The channel also includes collaborations and interviews with celebrities and other Youtubers.

Modeling
Mandeville models prosthetics for Open Bionics. In 2015, she modeled a Star Wars themed prosthetic arm for Fashion Finds the Force, designed by Open Bionics. She also modeled a prosthetic arm for Sophie de Oliveira Barata's "Alternative Limb Project" from which Mandeville was featured in the New York Times. Mandeville has also modeled for Dazed Magazine and TenEighty Magazine.

Personal life
Mandeville has taken part in a number of disability activism events and has been vocal about portrayal of people with disabilities in the media. In addition to having a foreshortened right arm, she is allergic to animal fur.

Mandeville currently lives with her family in Surrey. She began dating Ryan Anthony, a cyber security engineer, in May 2016, and the couple married in August 2019.  In January 2022, Mandeville announced that the couple was expecting a baby boy in June 2022. Her son was born on 5 June 2022.

Filmography

References

External links
 

1994 births
21st-century English actresses
Actresses from London
Living people